Biddinghuizen is a village in the municipality of Dronten in the Netherlands.

On 1 January 2018, the village had 6,295 inhabitants.

Biddinghuizen is home of the annual Lowlands Festival and Defqon.1 Festival and Biddinghuizen contains the theme park Walibi Holland.

A part of it is a standard speed skating rink, connected to the rest. The track was shortened from the original  in 2013.

In 1994, Biddinghuizen hosted the European Scout Jamboree.
In 1995 the 18th World Scout Jamboree was hosted. 28,960 Scouts and staff members from 166 countries and territories participated in this event.

The ultra athlete Ria Buiten is from Biddinghuizen.

References

External links 

Populated places in Flevoland
Dronten